Bishop Borgess High School was a Catholic secondary school in the Detroit suburb of Redford, Michigan. Named after Caspar Henry Borgess, the second Roman Catholic bishop of Detroit, it was founded by the parishes of St. Suzanne (in Detroit), Our Lady of Grace (Dearborn Heights), and St. Hilary (Redford). Later contributing parishes included St. Monica (Detroit), St. Robert Bellarmine (Redford), St. Gemma (Detroit)., St. Valentine (Redford), Christ the King (Detroit), St. Scholastica (Detroit), St. Thomas Aquinas (Detroit), and St. Gerard (Detroit).

When the school opened in September 1966, it had 317 students. During the 1970s, Bishop Borgess was the largest coeducational Catholic high school in Michigan, with a peak enrollment of 1,912 in 1978. Soon after reaching this peak, the demographics of northwest Detroit began to change and enrollment began decreasing. The Archdiocese of Detroit closed the school in 2005. Today, the school is a part of Cornerstone Schools under the name, Washington-Parks Academy.

Sports
Like Michigan State University, the school colors were green and white (also gold), and sports teams were known as the Spartans. Boys had teams for football, baseball, basketball, track, cross-country, soccer, and tennis. Girls had teams for softball, swimming, basketball, track and volleyball. The school was a member of Detroit's Catholic High School League and the Michigan High School Athletic Association (MHSAA).

In 1997 the boys basketball team made history by winning the school's first ever State Championship, coached by Roosevelt Barnes in only his second year as head coach. The following year, the boys basketball team won the Catholic League Championship but lost to Detroit Cass Tech in the City Championship game at Calihan Hall by the score of 73–68. The Spartans fell short of a back to back state title and were eliminated from the State playoffs in the Regional finals to eventual State Champion St. Martin DePorres. Bishop Borgess was led in both years by Aaron "A.J" Jessup and Sam Hoskin, who both went on to have successful Division I college basketball careers.

Activities
The school newspaper was the Harbinger. The annual yearbook was the Labyrinth. Dramatic plays were staged each fall, and musical productions in the spring. Other activities included debate, forensics (state champions in 1982 and 1984), language clubs, band, choir and student government council.

Notable alumni
Saul Anuzis - politician
Shawn Respert - NBA basketball player
Sam Hoskin - professional basketball player

External links

Educational institutions established in 1966
Educational institutions disestablished in 2005
Defunct Catholic secondary schools in Michigan
Schools in Wayne County, Michigan
1966 establishments in Michigan
2005 disestablishments in Michigan
Redford, Michigan